Sharifiyeh may refer to:
 Sharifiyeh, Khuzestan
 Sharifiyeh, Semnan